Berlin-Reinickendorf is an electoral constituency (German: Wahlkreis) represented in the Bundestag. It elects one member via first-past-the-post voting. Under the current constituency numbering system, it is designated as constituency 77. It is located in northern Berlin, comprising the Reinickendorf borough.

Berlin-Reinickendorf was created for the inaugural 1990 federal election after German reunification. Since 2021, it has been represented by Monika Grütters of the Christian Democratic Union (CDU).

Geography 
Berlin-Reinickendorf is located in northern Berlin. As of the 2021 federal election, it is coterminous with the Reinickendorf borough.

History 
Berlin-Reinickendorf was created after German reunification in 1990. In the 1990 election, it was constituency 250 in the numbering system. In the 1994 and 1998 elections, it was number 251. In the 2002 through 2009 elections, it was number 78. Since the 2013 election, it has been number 77. Its borders have not changed since its creation.

Members 
The constituency was first represented by Gabriele Wiechatzek of the Christian Democratic Union (CDU) from 1990 to 1994, followed by Diethard Schütze from 1994 to 1998. It was won by the Social Democratic Party (SPD) in 1998 and represented by Detlef Dzembritzki until 2009. Frank Steffel of the CDU was elected in 2009, and re-elected in 2013 and 2017. He was succeeded by Monika Grütters in 2021.

Election results

2021 election

2017 election

2013 election

2009 election

References 

Federal electoral districts in Berlin
Reinickendorf
1990 establishments in Germany
Constituencies established in 1990